HD 169142 is a single Herbig Ae/Be star. The star is rotating slowly and has relatively low stellar activity for a Herbig Ae/Be star.

Planetary system
The star is surrounded by a complex, rapidly evolving protoplanetary disk with two gaps. In the 1995-2005 period the disk inner edge has moved inward by 0.3 AU. The dust of the disk is rich in polycyclic aromatic hydrocarbons and carbon monoxide.

The annular gap and inner cavity observed in this protoplanetary disk both suggested the presence of embedded planets. Several protoplanet candidates have been suggested in the literature starting from 2014.

Nonetheless, a particular protoplanet candidate detected in 2015 and 2017 with the SPHERE instrument on the VLT appears to stand out, hereafter HD 169142 b. A paper from 2023 confirmed that the motion of this protoplanet candidate was consistent with Keplerian motion. The object shifted with a change of the position angle of 10.2±2.8° between 2015 and 2019. The researchers point out three lines of evidence arguing in favour of this object being a protoplanet:

 The object is found in annular gap separating the two bright rings of the disc, as predicted in theory
 The protoplanet moved between 2015, 2017 and 2019 consistent with Keplerian motion of an object at an distance of about 37 astronomical units from its star.
 A spiral-shaped signal consistent with the expected outer spiral wake triggered by a planet in the gap, based on simulations of the system.

The researchers also found the near-infrared colors of the object are consistent with starlight scattered by dust around the protoplanet. This dust could be a circumplanetary disk or a dusty envelope around the protoplanet.

References

Sagittarius (constellation)
Planetary transit variables
Herbig Ae/Be stars
Planetary systems with one confirmed planet
J18242978-2946492
CD-29 14904
169142
Circumstellar disks